Chris Osentowski (born February 26, 1975 in Des Moines, Iowa) is an American rugby union prop. He is a member of the United States national rugby union team and participated with the squad at the 2007 Rugby World Cup.

References

1975 births
Living people
Rugby union props
American rugby union players
United States international rugby union players